This list of gastropods described in 2016 is a list of new taxa of snails and slugs of every kind that have been described (following the rules of the ICZN) during the year 2016. The list only includes taxa at the level of genus or species. For changes in taxonomy above the level of genus, see Changes in the taxonomy of gastropods since 2005.

Fossil gastropods

Marine gastropods 

 Aforia obesa Pastorino & Sánchez, 2016
 Aforia watsoni Kantor, Harasewych & Puillandre, 2016
 Agladrillia aureola Fallon Jr., 2016
 Agladrillia torquata Fallon Jr., 2016
 Amoria stricklandi Bail & Limpus, 2016
 Ancilla atimovatae Kantor, Fedosov, Puillandre & Bouchet, 2016
 Ancilla kaviengensis Kantor, Fedosov, Puillandre & Bouchet, 2016
 Ancilla lhaumeti Kantor, Fedosov, Puillandre & Bouchet, 2016
 Ancilla morrisoni Kantor, Fedosov, Puillandre & Bouchet, 2016
 Angaria neocaledonica Günther, 2016
 Angaria rubrovaria Günther, 2016
 Angaria scalospinosa Günther, 2016
 Argeneuthria varicosa Pastorino, 2016
 Atlanta ariejansseni Wall-Palmer, Burridge & Peijnenburg, 2016
 Attiliosa eosae Espinosa & Ortea, 2016
 Bathyhedyle boucheti Neusser, Jörger, Lodde-Bensch, Strong & Schrödl, 2016
 Bayerotrochus delicatus Zhang, Zhang & Wei, 2016
 Bellaspira amplicostata Fallon Jr., 2016
 Bellaspira aurantiaca Fallon Jr., 2016
 Bellaspira barbadensis Fallon Jr., 2016
 Calyptoliva bbugeae Kantor, Fedosov, Puillandre & Bouchet, 2016
 Ceratia francisca Lima, Júnior, Guimarães & Dominguez, 2016
 Ceratia sergipana Lima, Júnior, Guimarães & Dominguez, 2016
 Clithon cryptum Eichhorst, 2016
 Clithon teres Eichhorst, 2016
 Conomodulus neocaledonensis Lozouet & Krygelmans, 2016
 Conus guanahacabibensis Espinosa & Ortea, 2016
 Conus molaerivus Dekkers, 2016
 Cribrarula boninensis Simone & Takashigue, 2016
 Cuspivolva singaporica Fehse & Koh, 2016
 Cuthona luciae Valdés, Medrano & Bhave, 2016
 Cuvierina tsudai Burridge, Janssen & Peijnenburg, 2016
 Dendronotus arcticus Korshunova, Sanamyan, Zimina, Fletcher & Martynov, 2016
 Dendronotus dudkai Ekimova, Schepetov, Chichvarkhina & Chichvarkhin, 2016
 Dendronotus robilliardi Korshunova, Sanamyan, Zimina, Fletcher & Martynov, 2016
 Desbruyeresia chamorrensis Chen, Ogura & Okutani in Chen et al., 2016
 Diodora giannispadai Assaoui, Puillandre & Bouchet, 2016
 Doris ananas Lima, Tibiriçá & Simone, 2016
 Doto carinova Moles, Avila & Wägele, 2016
 Drilliola antarctica Kantor, Harasewych & Puillandre, 2016
 Entocolax olgae Nekhaev, 2016
 Epidendrium parvitrochoides Nakayama in Nakayama & Hasegawa, 2016
 Erato africana Fehse, 2016
 Falsimargarita callista Marshall, 2016
 Falsimargarita challengerica Marshall, 2016
 Falsimargarita coriolis Marshall, 2016
 Falsimargarita eximia Marshall, 2016
 Falsimargarita kapala Marshall, 2016
 Falsimargarita tangaroa Marshall, 2016
 Favartia mariagordae Espinosa & Ortea, 2016
 Ficus schneideri Morrison, 2016
 Fusinus angeli Russo & Angelidis, 2016
 Fusinus damasoi Petuch & Berschauer, 2016
 Fusinus mariaodeteae Petuch & Berschauer, 2016
 Haliotis arabiensis Owen, Regter & Van Laethem, 2016
 Harpa queenslandica Berschauer & Petuch, 2016
 Hastulopsis masirahensis Terryn & Rosado, 2016
 Hastulopsis mirbatensis Terryn & Rosado, 2016
 Hermaea conejera Ortea, Moro & Caballer, 2016
 Hoplodoris madibenthos Ortea, 2016
 Hyalina saintjames Ortea & Espinosa, 2016
 Impages anosyana Bozzetti, 2016
 Inbiocystiscus tanialeonae Ortea & Espinosa, 2016
 Intelcystiscus teresacarrenoae Ortea & Espinosa, 2016
 Janolus gelidus Millen, 2016
 Jaspidiconus boriqua Petuch, Berschauer & Poremski, 2016
 Jaspidiconus culebranus Petuch, Berschauer & Poremski, 2016
 Jaspidiconus janapatriceae Petuch, Berschauer & Poremski, 2016
 Jaspidiconus josei Petuch & Berschauer, 2016
 Jaspidiconus marcusi Petuch, Berschauer & Poremski, 2016
 Jaspidiconus masinoi Petuch, Berschauer & Poremski, 2016
 Jujubinus errinae Smriglio, Mariottini & Giacobbe, 2016
 Kanoia myronfeinbergi Warén & Rouse, 2016
 Lamniconus petestimpsoni Petuch & Berschauer, 2016
 Lautoconus saharicus Petuch & Berschauer, 2016
 Lepetella furuncula Lima, Guimarães & Simone, 2016
 Leporicypraea rosea singularis Lorenz, 2016
 Lophiotoma natalensis
 Meteuthria batialis Pastorino, 2016
 Metula sulcata Zhang, Zhang & Zhang, 2016
 Miliariconus sinaiensis Petuch & Berschauer, 2016
 Mitra stossieri Herrmann, 2016
 Monostiolum simonei Watters, 2016
 Monstrotyphis takashigei Houart & Chino, 2016
 Murexiella hebeae Espinosa & Ortea, 2016
 Murexiella jacquesi Espinosa & Ortea, 2016
 Murexsul apollo Espinosa & Ortea, 2016
 Murexsul cubacaribaensis Espinosa & Ortea, 2016
 Murexsul cubacaribaensis Espinosa & Ortea, 2016
 Nassarius thachorum Dekker, Kool & van Gemert, 2016
 Nereina cresswelli Eichhorst, 2016
 Nerita grasi Eichhorst, 2016
 Neripteron subviolaceum Eichhorst, 2016
 Niveria bieleri Fehse & Grego, 2016
 Niveria guyana Fehse, 2016
 Niveria simonei Fehse, 2016
 Oliva kohi Hunon, Rabiller & Richard, 2016
 Phalium evdoxiae Morrison, 2016
 Phenacomargarites incomptus Marshall, 2016
 Phenacomargarites titan Marshall, 2016
 Phenacomargarites williamsae Marshall, 2016
 Philine baxteri Valdés, Cadien & Gosliner, 2016
 Philine harrisae Valdés, Cadien & Gosliner, 2016
 Philine malaquiasi Valdés, Cadien & Gosliner, 2016
 Philine mcleani Valdés, Cadien & Gosliner, 2016
 Philine wareni Valdés, Cadien & Gosliner, 2016
 Pionoconus quasimagus
 Pirenella arabica Reid in Reid & Ozawa, 2016
 Pirenella arabica Reid in Reid & Ozawa, 2016
 Pirenella asiatica Ozawa & Reid in Reid & Ozawa, 2016
 Pirenella austrocingulata Reid in Reid & Ozawa, 2016
 Pirenella cancellata Ozawa & Reid in Reid & Ozawa, 2016
 Pirenella delicatula Reid in Reid & Ozawa, 2016
 Pirenella nanhaiensis Fu & Reid in Reid & Ozawa, 2016
 Pirenella nipponica Ozawa & Reid in Reid & Ozawa, 2016
 Pirenella pupiformis Ozawa & Reid in Reid & Ozawa, 2016
 Pirenella rugosa Reid in Reid & Ozawa, 2016
 Plakobranchus papua Meyers-Muñoz & van der Velde in Meyers-Muñoz, van der Velde, van der Meij, Stoffels, van Alen, Tuti & Hoeksema, 2016
 Plesiocystiscus jardonae Ortea & Espinosa, 2016
 Pleutoromella petiti Kantor, Harasewych & Puillandre, 2016
 Pleutoromella tippetti Kantor, Harasewych & Puillandre, 2016
 Poremskiconus fonsecai Petuch & Berschauer, 2016
 Poremskiconus smoesi Petuch & Berschauer, 2016
 Provanna cingulata Chen, Watanabe & Ohara, 2016
 Provanna clathrata Sasaki, Ogura, Watanabe & Fujikura, 2016
 Provanna lucida Sasaki, Ogura, Watanabe & Fujikura, 2016
 Provanna kuroshimensis Sasaki, Ogura, Watanabe & Fujikura, 2016
 Provanna subglabra Sasaki, Ogura, Watanabe & Fujikura, 2016
 Profundiconus barazeri Tenorio & Castelin, 2016
 Profundiconus limpalaeri Tenorio & Monnier, 2016
 Profundiconus maribelae Tenorio & Castelin, 2016
 Profundiconus neocaledonicus Tenorio & Castelin, 2016
 Profundiconus puillandrei Tenorio & Castelin, 2016
 Profundiconus robmoolenbeeki Tenorio, 2016
 Profundiconus virginiae Tenorio & Castelin, 2016
 Pterygia morrisoni Marrow, 2016
 Pygmaepterys habanensis Espinosa & Ortea, 2016
 Pygmaepterys tacoensis Espinosa & Ortea, 2016
 Pygmaepterys yemayaensis Espinosa & Ortea, 2016
 Quijote cervantesi Ortea, Moro & Bacallado, 2016
 Raphitoma alida Pusateri & Giannuzzi-Savelli in Pusateri, Giannuzzi-Savelli & Bartolini, 2016
 Raphitoma maculosa Høisaeter, 2016
 Raphitoma obesa Høisaeter, 2016
 Rapturella ryani Salvador & Cunha, 2016
 Retimohnia lussae Kosyan & Kantor, 2016
 Retimohnia mcleani Kosyan & Kantor, 2016
 Rissoina hernandezi Faber & Gori, 2016
 Rissoina mirjamae Faber & Gori, 2016
 Scabricola ivanmarrowi Marrow, 2016
 Sciteconus ariejooste
 Sciteconus nahoonensis
 Sciteconus velliesi
 Sciteconus xhosa
 Severnsia strombeulima Geiger, 2016
 Spiniphiline persei Caballer & Ortea, 2016
 Sulcorissoina stasii Faber & Gori, 2016
 Teinostoma brankovitsi Rubio, Rolán, Worsaae, Martínez & Gonzalez, 2016
 Ticofurcilla maryolisae Ortea, 2016
 Tomura rubiorolanorum Romani & Sbrana, 2016
 Tritonia newfoundlandica Valdés, Murillo, McCarthy & Yedinak, 2016
 Triviella lorenzi Fehse, 2016
 Triviella carptima Fehse, 2016
 Triviella chiapponii Fehse, 2016
 Triviella martybealsi Fehse, 2016
 Triviella montorum Fehse, 2016
 Turbo moolenbeeki Dekker & Dekkers, 2016
 Venustatrochus eclectus Marshall, 2016
 Venustatrochus galatheae Marshall, 2016
 Venustatrochus youngi Marshall, 2016
 Viduoliva tricolor abbasi Thach & Berschauer, 2016
 Xanthodaphne pastorinoi Kantor, Harasewych & Puillandre, 2016
 Zebina moolenbeeki Faber & Gori, 2016
 Zoila venusta morrisoni Lorenz, 2016
Other taxa
 genus Antarctophiline Chaban, 2016
 genus Antarctospira Kantor, Harasewych & Puillandre, 2016
 genus Argeneuthria Pastorino, 2016
 genus Bathyhedyle Neusser, Jörger, Lodde-Bensch, Strong & Schrödl, 2016
 genus Falsimacme Pastorino, 2016
 genus Kanoia Warén & Rouse, 2016
 genus Microdeuthria Pastorino, 2016
 genus Phenacomargarites Marshall, 2016
 genus Quijote Ortea, Moro & Bacallado, 2016
 genus Rapturella Salvador & Cunha, 2016
 genus Severnsia Geiger, 2016

Freshwater gastropods 
 Bythinella walensae Falniowski, Hofman & Rysiewska, 2016
 Chilina luciae Gutiérrez Gregoric & de Lucía, 2016
 Chilina nicolasi Gutiérrez Gregoric & de Lucía, 2016
 Chilina santiagoi Gutiérrez Gregoric & de Lucía, 2016
 Cipangopaludina hehuensis Lu, Fang & Du, 2016
 Iglica calepii Niero & Pezzoli, 2016
 Iglica kanalitensis Reischütz, Steiner-Reischütz & Reischütz, 2016
 Myrtoessa hyas Radea in Radea, Parmakelis & Giokas, 2016
 Nicolaia schniebsae Glöer & Bößneck in Glöer, Bößneck, Walther & , 2016
 Paladilhiopsis prezensis Reischütz, Steiner-Reischütz & Reischütz, 2016
 Pseudobaikalia michelae Sitnikova & Kovalenkova in Sitnikova, Kovalenkova, Peretolchina & Sherbakov, 2016
 Pseudamnicola ianthe Radea & Parmakelis in Radea, Parmakelis, Velentzas & Triantis, 2016
 Pseudamnicola ilione Radea & Parmakelis in Radea, Parmakelis, Velentzas & Triantis, 2016
 Pseudamnicola magdalenae Falniowski, 2016
 Pyrgulopsis hualapaiensis Hershler, Liu & Stevens, 2016
 Shadinia bjniensis Bößneck, Walther &  in Glöer, Bößneck, Walther & , 2016
Other taxa
 genus Diegus Delicado, Machordom & Ramos, 2016
 genus Intermaria Delicado, Pešić & Glöer, 2016
 genus Myrtoessa Radea in Radea, Parmakelis & Giokas, 2016
 genus Nicolaia Glöer, Bößneck, Walther & , 2016
 genus Persipyrgula Delicado, Pešić & Glöer, 2016

Land gastropods 
 Abbottella crataegus Watters, 2016
 Agardhiella mista Reischütz, Steiner-Reischütz & Reischütz, 2016
 Amphidromus stevenliei Parsons, 2016
 Amphiscopus moolenbeeki Bank, Menkhorst & Neubert, 2016
 Amphiscopus sturmii marmoratus Bank, Menkhorst & Neubert, 2016
 Angustopila singuladentis Inkhavilay & Panha in Inkhavilay, Sutcharit, Tongkerd & Panha, 2016
 Argna szekeresi Reischütz, Steiner-Reischütz & Reischütz, 2016
 Arinia micro Marzuki & Foon, 2016
 Atlasica anflousiana
 Awalycaeus shiosakimasahiroi Yano, Matsuda & Nishi in Yano, Matsuda, Nishi, Kawase & Hayase, 2016
 Awalycaeus yanoshokoae Yano & Matsuda in Yano, Matsuda, Nishi, Kawase & Hayase, 2016
 Bahiensis ribeirensis Salvador, Cavallari & Simone, 2016
 Balcanodiscus mirus Reischütz, Steiner-Reischütz & Reischütz, 2016
 Bathyptychia aplostoma ookuboi Hunyadi & Szekeres, 2016
 Bathyptychia beresowskii eremita Hunyadi & Szekeres, 2016
 Bathyptychia martensi immersa Hunyadi & Szekeres, 2016
 Bathyptychia septentrionalis Nordsieck, 2016
 Bothriembryon sophiarum Whisson & Breure, 2016
 Camaena abbasi Thach, 2016
 Camaena detianensis Zhou & Lin in Ai, Lin, Wang, Zhou & Hwang, 2016
 Camaena lingyunensis Zhou & Lin in Ai, Lin, Wang, Zhou & Hwang, 2016
 Camaena poyuensis Zhou, Wang & Ding in Ding, Wang, Qian, Lin, Zhou, Hwang & Ai, 2016
 Caracolus cimarron Espinosa, Fernández-Velázquez & Ortea, 2016
 Clausilioides berendinae Bank, Menkhorst & Neubert, 2016
 Clausilioides palatalis Bank, Menkhorst & Neubert, 2016
 Cochlodinella pinera Herrera-Uria, Espinosa & Ortea, 2016
 Cochlodinella pirata Herrera-Uria, Espinosa & Ortea, 2016
 Discartemon moolenbeeki Maassen, 2016
 Entadella entadiformis Páll-Gergely & Hunyadi in Páll-Gergely, Hunyadi, Otani & Asami, 2016
 Euchondrus adwani Neubert & Amr, 2016
 Euphaedusa latens Hunyadi & Szekeres, 2016
 Euphaedusa sericea Hunyadi & Szekeres, 2016
 Formosana abscedens Hunyadi & Szekeres, 2016
 Fruticocampylaea tushetica Walther,  & Hausdorf, 2016
 Geminula dolmenensis Bank & Neubert, 2016
 Geminula pyramidata Bank & Neubert, 2016
 Geminula urmiensis Bank & Neubert, 2016
 Glyphyalus quillensis de Winter, van Leeuwen & Hovestadt, 2016
 Gonyostomus elinae Simone, 2016
 Grandinenia crassilabris Nordsieck, 2016
 Grandinenia rutila Nordsieck, 2016
 Grandinenia pallidissima ooharai Hunyadi & Szekeres, 2016
 Gudeoconcha sophiae intermedia Hyman & Ponder, 2016
 Gudeodiscus longiplica Páll-Gergely & Asami, 2016
 Gulella davisae Herbert, 2016
 Gulella hadroglossa Herbert, 2016
 Gyliotrachela plesiolopa Inkhavilay & Panha in Inkhavilay, Sutcharit, Tongkerd & Panha, 2016
 Helicopsis persica Hausdorf & Bössneck, 2016
 Hemiphaedusa ptycholunella Nordsieck, 2016
 Hunyadiscus saurini Páll-Gergely in Páll-Gergely, Muratov & Asami, 2016
 Imparietula inflexa Bank, Menkhorst & Neubert, 2016
 Iranopsis granulata Bank & Neubert, 2016
 Kora rupestris Salvador & Simone, 2016
 Leiostracus carnavalescus Simone & Salvador, 2016
 Leiostyla eikenboomi Bank, Menkhorst & Neubert, 2016
 Leiostyla paphlagonica subangulosa Bank, Menkhorst & Neubert, 2016
 Liocallonia torrebartschi Herrera-Uria & Espinosa, 2016
 Lithocouperia kalkajaka Stanisic, 2016
 Ljudmilena callosa Bank, Menkhorst & Neubert, 2016
 Ljudmilena mariannae Bank, Menkhorst & Neubert, 2016
 Lorelliana hoskini Stanisic, 2016
 Megavitrina imperatoria Bank, Menkhorst & Neubert, 2016
 Minatoia inopinata Hunyadi & Szekeres, 2016
 Miraphaedusa gregoi Hunyadi & Szekeres, 2016
 Montenegrina grammica erosszoltani Fehér & Szekeres, 2016
 Montenegrina grammica improvisa Fehér & Szekeres, 2016
 Montenegrina haringae Fehér & Szekeres, 2016
 Montenegrina hiltrudae desaretica Fehér & Szekeres, 2016
 Montenegrina hiltrudae selcensis Fehér & Szekeres, 2016
 Montenegrina laxa delii Fehér & Szekeres, 2016
 Montenegrina lillae Fehér & Szekeres, 2016
 Montenegrina nana barinai Fehér & Szekeres, 2016
 Montenegrina prokletiana prokletiana Fehér & Szekeres, 2016
 Montenegrina prokletiana kovacsorum Fehér & Szekeres, 2016
 Montenegrina rugilabris golikutensis Fehér & Szekeres, 2016
 Montenegrina rugilabris gregoi Fehér & Szekeres, 2016
 Montenegrina skipetarica danyii Fehér & Szekeres, 2016
 Montenegrina skipetarica gurelurensis Fehér & Szekeres, 2016
 Montenegrina skipetarica pifkoi Fehér & Szekeres, 2016
 Montenegrina skipetarica puskasi Fehér & Szekeres, 2016
 Montenegrina sporadica tropojana Fehér & Szekeres, 2016
 Montenegrina sturanyana sturanyana Fehér & Szekeres, 2016
 Montenegrina sturanyana gropana Fehér & Szekeres, 2016
 Montenegrina sturanyana ostrovicensis Fehér & Szekeres, 2016
 Montenegrina tomorosi hunyadii Fehér & Szekeres, 2016
 Multidentula reducta Bank, Menkhorst & Neubert, 2016
 Muticaria cyclopica Liberto, Reitano, Giglio, Colomba & Sparacio, 2016
 Myxostoma petiverianum tenggolensis Foon, 2016
 Nata aequiplicata Herbert & Moussalli, 2016
 Nata erugata Herbert & Moussalli, 2016
 Nata watsoni Herbert & Moussalli, 2016
 Obeliscus boitata Simone & Salvador, 2016
 Obelus zarzaensis , Walther, Santana, Alonso & Ibáñez, 2016
 Oospira antilopina antilopa Nordsieck, 2016
 Oospira duci pentaptychia Nordsieck, 2016
 Oospira duci tetraptychia Nordsieck, 2016
 Oospira eregia christae Nordsieck, 2016
 Oospira goniostoma Nordsieck, 2016
 Oospira jensi Nordsieck, 2016
 Oospira minutissima Hunyadi & Szekeres, 2016
 Oospira ootayoshinarii Hunyadi & Szekeres, 2016
 Oospira pacifica decapitata Nordsieck, 2016
 Oospira splendens amphicola Nordsieck, 2016
 Oospira truncatula Hunyadi & Szekeres, 2016
 Oxyloma sarsii tulomica Schikov & Nekhaev, 2016
 Paraboysidia anguloobtusus Inkhavilay & Panha in Inkhavilay, Sutcharit, Tongkerd & Panha, 2016
 Paraboysidia paralella Inkhavilay & Panha in Inkhavilay, Sutcharit, Tongkerd & Panha, 2016
 Parachondria anatolensis Watters, 2016
 Parachondria arcisensis Watters, 2016
 Parachondria daedalus Watters, 2016
 Parachondria heatheraikenae Watters, 2016
 Parachondria isabellinus Watters, 2016
 Parachondria joyeuse Watters, 2016
 Parachondria muchai Watters, 2016
 Parachondria silvaticus Watters, 2016
 Parachondria stigmosus Watters, 2016
 Parmellops perspicuus Hyman & Ponder, 2016
 Phaedusa matejkoi ooharai Hunyadi & Szekeres, 2016
 Phaedusa percostata Nordsieck, 2016
 Plagiodontes parodizi Pizá & Cazzaniga, 2016
 Platyla ceraunorum Reischütz, Steiner-Reischütz & Reischütz, 2016
 Pseudochondrula arsaci Bank & Neubert, 2016
 Pseudochondrula bondouxi Bank & Neubert, 2016
 Pseudochondrula darii Bank & Neubert, 2016
 Pseudochondrula orientalis Bank & Neubert, 2016
 Pseudonapaeus alborsicus Bank & Neubert, 2016
 Pseudonapaeus demorgani Bank & Neubert, 2016
 Pseudonapaeus fusiformis Bank & Neubert, 2016
 Pseudonapaeus ignoratus Bank & Neubert, 2016
 Pseudonapaeus kermanensis Bank & Neubert, 2016
 Pseudonapaeus menkhorsti Bank & Neubert, 2016
 Pseudonapaeus minutus Bank & Neubert, 2016
 Pseudonapaeus orculoides Bank & Neubert, 2016
 Ptilototheca soutpansbergensis Herbert, 2016
 Ptychauchenia panhai euclista Nordsieck, 2016
 Quistrachia nevbrownlowi Stanisic, 2016
 Reticularopa minjerribah Stanisic, 2016
 Rhinus botocudus Simone & Salvador, 2016
 Sciocochlea cryptica harli Reischütz, Reischütz & Szekeres, 2016
 Selenophaedusa dentifera Hunyadi & Szekeres, 2016
 Serriphaedusa diaphana Hunyadi & Szekeres, 2016
 Serriphaedusa fusiformis Hunyadi & Szekeres, 2016
 Serriphaedusa ishibei Hunyadi & Szekeres, 2016
 Serriphaedusa ootanii Hunyadi & Szekeres, 2016
 Serriphaedusa pseudookuboi Nordsieck, 2016
 Serriphaedusa serrata emeicola Nordsieck, 2016
 Serriphaedusa serrata sericina Nordsieck, 2016
 Setobaudinia nicolasi Criscione & Köhler, 2016
 Sheldonia monsmaripi Herbert, 2016
 Sheldonia wolkbergensis Herbert, 2016
 Siciliaria calcarae orlandoi Liberto, Reitano, Giglio, Colomba & Sparacio, 2016
 Sinoennea euryomphala Inkhavilay & Panha in Inkhavilay, Sutcharit, Tongkerd & Panha, 2016
 Sinoennea reischuetzorum Maassen, 2016
 Sphendone insolita Slapcinsky & Kraus, 2016
 Synprosphyma aegrota Hunyadi & Szekeres, 2016
 Synprosphyma basilissa ishibei Hunyadi & Szekeres, 2016
 Synprosphyma gibbosula basalifera Nordsieck, 2016
 Synprosphyma hosodai Hunyadi & Szekeres, 2016
 Synprosphyma incrustata Nordsieck, 2016
 Synprosphyma ookuboi Hunyadi & Szekeres, 2016
 Synprosphyma pallgergelyi Hunyadi & Szekeres, 2016
 Synprosphyma wanshinensis monachorum Hunyadi & Szekeres, 2016
 Tetrentodon jaumei Herrera-Uria & Espinosa, 2016
 Theba pisana almogravensis Holyoak & Holyoak, 2016
 Tropidauchenia mengyuanensis
 Truncatellina algoviana Colling & Karle-Fendt, 2016
 Tsoukatosia argolica Reischütz, Reischütz & Szekeres, 2016
 Tsoukatosia nicolae Reischütz, Reischütz & Szekeres, 2016
 Tsoukatosia pallgergelyi Reischütz, Reischütz & Szekeres, 2016
 Tudora paraguanensis Hovestadt, 2016
 Turanena andonakii salpinx Bank, Menkhorst & Neubert, 2016
 Turanena elegantula Bank, Menkhorst & Neubert, 2016
 Turanena pseudobscura Bank & Neubert, 2016
 Vargapupa humilis Páll-Gergely, 2016
 Xanthomelon arnhemense Köhler & Burghardt, 2016
 Xanthomelon darwinense Köhler & Burghardt, 2016
 Xeroleuca pallaryi

Other taxa
 subgenus Aegaeotheba  & Hausdorf, 2016
 genus Anatolya Páll-Gergely & Bank, 2016
 subgenus Campylaea (Oricampylaea) Groenenberg, Subai & Gittenberger, 2016
 genus Chordaropa Stanisic, 2016
 genus Entadella Páll-Gergely & Hunyadi in Páll-Gergely, Hunyadi, Otani & Asami, 2016
 genus Graniberia Gittenberger, Groenenberg & Kokshoorn in Gittenberger, Kokshoorn, Bößneck, Reijnen & Groenenberg, 2016
 subgenus Grohiellus , Walther, Santana, Alonso & Ibáñez, 2016
 genus Hunyadiscus Páll-Gergely in Páll-Gergely, Muratov & Asami, 2016
 genus Kollarix Groenenberg, Subai & Gittenberger, 2016
 genus Lithocouperia Stanisic, 2016
 genus Lorelliana Stanisic, 2016
 genus Megavitrina Bank, Menkhorst & Neubert, 2016
 genus Minatoia Hunyadi & Szekeres, 2016
 genus Mordaniella Bank & Neubert, 2016
 genus Naggsia Páll-Gergely & Muratov in Páll-Gergely, Muratov & Asami, 2016
 subgenus Pontotheba  & Hausdorf, 2016
 genus Pseudojaminia Páll-Gergely & Bank, 2016
 genus Pseudotrizona Groenenberg, Subai & Gittenberger, 2016
 genus Ptilototheca Herbert, 2016
 genus Reticularopa Stanisic, 2016
 subgenus Rhytidotheba  & Hausdorf, 2016
 genus Sphendone Slapcinsky & Kraus, 2016
 subgenus Trichotheba  & Hausdorf, 2016

See also 
 List of gastropods described in 2015
 List of gastropods described in 2017

References 

Gastropods